= Art Farm =

Artist residency in Nebraska

Coordinates: 40.9873°N 98.0490°W

Art Farm is a south central Nebraskan writer and artist residency. The 'farm' component of Art Farm refers to the cultivation of culture, not to an actual operation of a farm, with an intention to recapture the vibrant social life of rural communities lost to the industrialization of agriculture. Officially it was established in 1993. One of Art Farm's main goals is to salvage and reuse structures from the surrounding farm lands. In the process of doing so, they have physically moved many abandoned buildings to create the main barn structure and the main house. The main barn structure on the land is a large and shifting complex of various historic barns, regularly being added to and maintained with restoration projects to keep the complex a living and studio space for the artists residing therein. The other main structure is a formerly abandoned family farm house that is roughly 125 years old.

Art Farm accepts around fourteen residents at a time. Residents give labor in exchange for space and time to work freely on their art, along with access to the Art Farm's various materials and some collaboration with other artists. Residencies last from 2 weeks to 5 months.
